Avonley Claren Nguyen (born November 22, 2002) is an American ice dancer. With her former partner, Vadym Kolesnik, she is the 2020 World Junior champion, the 2019–20 Junior Grand Prix Final silver medalist, and the 2020 U.S. junior national champion. She has also won four medals on the ISU Junior Grand Prix series, including three golds, and qualified to the 2018–19 Junior Grand Prix Final.

During the 2021-2022 season, she competed with Grigory Smirnov.

Personal life 
Nguyen was born on November 22, 2002, in Cleveland, Ohio.

Career

Early years 
Nguyen began learning to skate in 2009. She began solo ice dance at age 11 and switched from singles to ice dance at the age of 12. With her first partner, Maxwell Gart, she won silver in the intermediate category at the 2016 U.S. Championships.

2016–2017 season 
In autumn 2016, Nguyen and Ukrainian ice dancer Vadym Kolesnik had a three-week tryout in Novi, Michigan, following which he returned to Ukraine for a few months. They began their partnership in February 2017.

2017–2018 season 
Nguyen/Kolesnik received their first ISU Junior Grand Prix (JGP) assignments in the 2017–2018 season. They placed fifth at JGP Belarus and sixth at JGP Italy. After taking gold in junior ice dancing at Midwestern Sectionals, they qualified to the 2018 U.S. Championships, where they would finish fifth.

2018–2019 season 
Nguyen/Kolesnik won the silver medal at 2018 JGP Lithuania, behind Russia's Arina Ushakova / Maxim Nekrasov, and the gold at 2018 JGP Slovenia to qualify for their first JGP Final. They placed fifth overall at the 2018–19 Junior Grand Prix Final after placing fifth in the rhythm dance and fifth in the free dance.

At the 2019 U.S. Championships they won the silver medal behind Caroline Green / Gordon Green after placing second in the rhythm dance and winning the free dance.

At the 2019 World Junior Championships, Nguyen/Kolesnik placed fifth in the rhythm dance, but moved up to fourth overall after placing third in the free dance.  They were awarded a small bronze medal for the free, where they had the highest technical base value of any of the competing teams, and the second-highest technical score overall.

2019–2020 season: Junior World title

Nguyen/Kolesnik began their Junior Grand Prix season at the 2019 JGP United States, where they placed first in both segments with personal best scores and won the gold medal. At 2019 JGP Poland, they again set personal best scores in both segments to take the title and qualify for the 2019–20 ISU Junior Grand Prix Final.  Competing at the Final, Nguyen/Kolesnik narrowly lost the gold medal by only 0.16 points behind Maria Kazakova / Georgy Reviya of Georgia at the JGP Final.  She commented "we're a little disappointed right now, but we’ll continue to keep on working. All our competitors were really strong. We were only a fourth of a point behind and we felt we could push and get to the next level, but it didn’t work out."

At the 2020 U.S. Figure Skating Championships, Nguyen/Kolesnik scored 184.38 total points to take the gold medal by more than 22 points. Their free dance, set to Rachmaninoff's "Piano Concerto No. 2," featured all positive grades of execution and eight Level 4 elements, earning 109.89 points.

At the 2020 Bavarian Open, they placed first in both the rhythm dance and free dance to win the gold medal. They concluded the season at the 2020 World Junior Championships in Tallinn, Estonia, where they entered as one of the favorites for the title.  Nguyen/Kolesnik placed third in the rhythm dance, behind Shanaeva/Naryzhnyy and Kazakova/Reviya, after Nguyen stepped out of her twizzle sequence.  She remarked that they had "left a few points on the table, but now we'll focus on the free dance."  They won the free dance, setting a new junior world record and taking the Junior World title over Kazakova/Reviya.  Nguyen said afterward "I've dreamed about this moment for so long and to know that our work finally paid off, it just feels great!"  Kolesnik indicated that they had not decided whether to move up to senior competition or remain at the junior level for another season.

At the end of June, Nguyen announced that the two had split. She said she had "many happy memories" of their partnership, and wished him the best as they "pursued different paths." She said she was going to look for a new partner who shared her "passion, dedication and commitment" to the sport. Within minutes, Kolesnik's announcement post followed. He thanked Nguyen "for all you have done for our partnership," expressed his admiration for her, and wished her all the best.

2020–2021 & 2021–2022 seasons 
Nguyen did not compete during the 2020–2021 season. In September 2021, it was confirmed that she and Russian ice dancer Grigory Smirnov had teamed up for the United States after Smirnov's former partner, Anastasia Shpilevaya, was forced to retire. They were scheduled to make their U.S. Championship debut in January of 2022, but withdrew after Smirnov suffered a hip injury.

Programs

With Smirnov

With Kolesnik

Records and achievements

Junior world record scores 
Nguyen/Kolesnik are the current junior world record holders for the free dance.

Competitive highlights 
JGP: Junior Grand Prix

With Smirnov

With Kolesnik

With Gart

Detailed results 
Small medals awarded only at ISU Championships. ISU personal bests highlighted in bold.

With Kolesnik

Junior results

With Gart

Intermediate results

References

External links 
 

! colspan="3" style="border-top: 5px solid #78FF78;" |World Junior Record Holders

2002 births
American female ice dancers
Living people
Sportspeople from Cleveland
World Junior Figure Skating Championships medalists
American dancers of Asian descent
American sportspeople of Vietnamese descent
21st-century American women